This is a list of notable events in Latin music (i.e. Spanish- and Portuguese-speaking music from Latin America, Europe, and the United States) that took place in 2011.

Bands formed 
Pablo Alborán
Max Capote
3Ball MTY
Natalia Jiménez
Dulce María
El Bebeto y su Banda Patria Chica
Monchy & Nathalia
Loisaidas
Henry Santos

Bands reformed

Bands disbanded

Bands on hiatus

Events
January 8 — Billboard revamps the methodology for the Latin Rhythm Airplay chart to only track Latin rhythm songs from Spanish-language radio stations in the United States. Previously, the Latin Rhythm Airplay chart ranked the most-played songs on Latin rhythm radio stations regardless of genre.
November 10 — The 12th Annual Latin Grammy Awards are held at the Mandalay Bay Events Center in Las Vegas, Nevada.
Calle 13 breaks the record for the most awarded artist in a single ceremony with nine wins including Record of the Year and Song of the Year for "Latinoamérica" and Album of the Year for Entren Los Que Quieran.
Sie7e wins Best New Artist.
Colombian singer Shakira was honored as the Latin Recording Academy Person of the Year

Number-ones albums and singles by country
List of Hot 100 number-one singles of 2011 (Brazil)
List of number-one albums of 2011 (Mexico)
List of number-one albums of 2011 (Portugal)
List of number-one albums of 2011 (Spain)
List of number-one singles of 2011 (Spain)
List of number-one Billboard Latin Albums from the 2010s
List of number-one Billboard Top Latin Songs of 2011

Awards
2011 Premio Lo Nuestro
2011 Billboard Latin Music Awards
2011 Latin Grammy Awards
2011 Tejano Music Awards

Albums released

First quarter

January

February

March

Second quarter

April

May

June

Third quarter

July

August

September

Fourth quarter

October

November
{| class="wikitable sortable" style="text-align: left;"
|-
! Day
! Title
! Artist
! Genre(s)
! Singles
! Label
|-
|rowspan="5"|1
|Mi Amigo El Príncipe
| Cristian Castro
| Latin pop
| "Lo Dudo"
| Universal Music Latino
|-
|Mi Última Grabación
| Tito Nieves
| Salsa
| "Eres Linda"
| 
|-
|Así
| Shaila Dúrcal
| 
| 
| 
|-
|Amor de Alma
| Victor & Leo
| 
| 
| 
|-
|Pandora – XXV Años (En Vivo)
| Pandora
| 
| 
| 
|-
|4
|¡¡Buenos Dias, Mundo!!
| Rosana
| 
| 
| 
|-
|6
|Reconocer
| Pamela Rodriguez
| 
| 
| 
|-
|rowspan="5"|8
|Formula, Vol. 1
| Romeo Santos
| Bachata, Latin pop, R&B
| "You""Promise""Mi Santa""All Aboard""Rival""La Diabla"
| Sony Music Latin
|-
|Flamenco
| Diana Navarro
| 
| 
| 
|-
|Homenaje a las Grandes Canciones, Vol. II
| Kalimba
| 
| 
| 
|-
|La Mejor De Todas
| Banda El Recodo de Cruz Lizarraga
| 
| 
| 
|-
|DEL Records Presenta: Enfermedad Masiva Vol. 2
| Various artists
| 
| 
| 
|-
|rowspan="2"|10
|Via Dalma II
| Sergio Dalma
| 
| 
| 
|-
|Chitãozinho & Xororó – 40 Anos – Sinfônico
| Chitãozinho & Xororó
| 
| 
| 
|-
|11
|Inédito
| Laura Pausini
| 
| 
| 
|-
|rowspan="3"|15
|En Acústico
| Pablo Alborán
| 
| 
| 
|-
|Brava!
| Paulina Rubio
| Latin pop
| "Me Gustas Tanto"
| 
|-
|Márchate Y Olvídame
| Julión Álvarez Y Su Norteño Banda
| 
| 
| 
|-
|20
|Canibália – Ritmos do Brasil (Ao Vivo)
| Daniela Mercury
| 
| 
| 
|-
|rowspan="7"|21
|[[Joyas Prestadas|Joyas Prestadas: Pop and Joyas Prestadas: Banda]]
| Jenni Rivera
| Latin pop, banda
| "¡Basta Ya!""A Cambio de Que""Detrás de Mi Ventana"
| Fonovisa
|-
|Otra Vez| Vicente Fernández
| 
| 
| 
|-
|Sono Sono: Tite Curet| Various artists
| 
| 
| 
|-
|Afronauta| Caseroloops 
| 
| 
| 
|-
|2.0| Estopa
| 
| 
| 
|-
|Aires de Navidad| N'Klabe
| Salsa
| 
| 
|-
|Busco un Pueblo| Víctor Manuelle
| Salsa
| "Si Tú Me Besas""Ella Lo Que Quiere Es Salsa"
| Sony Music Latin
|-
|28
|Caminos| Gaitanes
| 
| 
| 
|-
|29
|Cuando Quieras| Antonio Cortés
| 
| 
| 
|-
|}

December

Unknown

Best-selling records
Best-selling albums
The following is a list of the top 10 best-selling Latin albums in the United States in 2011, according to Billboard.

Best-performing songs
The following is a list of the top 10 best-performing Latin songs in the United States in 2011, according to Billboard.

Deaths
January 24 – Francisco Mata, 78, Venezuelan folk singer and composer.
February 25 – Eneas Perdomo, 80, Venezuelan folk singer.
March 26 – Lula Côrtes, 61, Brazilian musician (Paêbirú''), throat cancer
May 7 – Johnny Albino, 93, Puerto Rican bolero singer, heart attack.
July 9 – Facundo Cabral, 74, Argentine singer and songwriter, shot.
July 14 – Antonio Prieto, 85, Chilean singer and actor, cardiac arrest.
July 26 – Joe Arroyo, 55, Colombian singer.
August 10 – Moraíto Chico II, 54, Spanish musician, cancer.

References 

 
Latin music by year